Without Your Love may refer to:

Albums 
Without Your Love (Dionne Warwick album) or the title song, 1985
Without Your Love (oOoOO album) or the title song, 2013
Without Your Love, by Guji Lorenzana, 2007

Songs 
"Without Your Love" (Aaron Tippin song), 1996
"Without Your Love" (André song), representing Armenia at Eurovision 2006
"Without Your Love" (Gary O'Shaughnessy song), representing Ireland at Eurovision 2001
"Without Your Love" (Roger Daltrey song), 1980
"Without Your Love", by Barbra Streisand from Guilty Pleasures
"Without Your Love", by Blackjack from Blackjack
"Without Your Love", by Chris Stapleton from From A Room: Volume 1
"Without Your Love", by Enuff Z'nuff from Tweaked
"Without Your Love", by Kumi Koda from Gentle Words
"Without Your Love", by Magnum from Kingdom of Madness
"Without Your Love", by Neil Sedaka from 3 Great Guys
"Without Your Love", by TNT from Knights of the New Thunder
"Without Your Love", by Tom Novy with Adrian Misiewicz and Lima
"Without Your Love", by Toto from Fahrenheit